Offutt may refer to:

Offutt (surname)
Offutt, Kentucky
Offutt Air Force Base, United States Air Force airbase in Sarpy County, Nebraska
Offutt Field (Greensburg), Professional baseball and American football venue in Greensburg, Pennsylvania